Lise-Marie Morerod (born 16 April 1956) is a Swiss former slalom skier. In 1977, she was women's overall season champion.

Biography
She born in Les Diablerets, Vaud. In 1972, at age 15, she became Swiss champion in giant slalom. Her winning the bronze medal in the slalom race at the FIS Alpine Skiing World Championships was a great surprise because she was an unknown racer. (Best racers wear  bib numbers between 1 and 15; she had 39.) It was the only medal won by the Swiss racers at their "Home World Championships". At the 1976 Winter Olympics, she took fourth place in the giant slalom but didn't finish the slalom race. 
She achieved 24 victories and another 17 podiums in World Cup races and was the first Swiss racer to win the Overall World Cup.

A car accident in July 1978 left Morerod in a coma for six weeks and led to a six-month hospital stay. The injuries she sustained in the accident left her with long-term memory problems. She returned to the World Cup in 1979, but failed to find her previous form and did not qualify for the 1980 Winter Olympics. She retired after the 1979–80 season.

World Cup victories

Overall

Individual races

References

External links
 
 

1956 births
Living people
People from Aigle District
Swiss female alpine skiers
FIS Alpine Ski World Cup champions
Olympic alpine skiers of Switzerland
Alpine skiers at the 1976 Winter Olympics
Sportspeople from the canton of Vaud